Ollerenshaw may refer to:

 Eric Ollerenshaw (born 1950), British politician
 Kathleen Ollerenshaw (1912–2014), British mathematician and politician
 Keith Ollerenshaw (1928–2016), Australian long-distance runner
 Maggie Ollerenshaw (born 1949), British actress
 Scott Ollerenshaw (born 1968), Australian association football player

See also
 Rick Olarenshaw